Stephen Cooper (born June 19, 1979) is a former American football linebacker for the San Diego Chargers of the National Football League (NFL).  He played college football for the University of Maine.  He was signed by the San Diego Chargers as an undrafted free agent in 2003, and played his entire professional career for the Chargers.

College career
Cooper verbally committed to attend the U.S. Naval Academy but transferred closer to home at the University of Maine to try and earn a scholarship.  In an interview with Tom Shanahan, Cooper said his decision was a family one.  "We weren't really thinking about professional football," Cooper said, "We were thinking about a job after college, and if you go to the Naval Academy, you're not going to get turned away for a job."  Because his high school coach and Maine Black Bears football head coach Jack Cosgrove played together in college, Cooper was offered a scholarship and became an instant star.  Cooper earned Maine's Roger Ellis Rookie of Year Award his freshman year in 1999.  As a junior, Cooper earned Atlantic-10 Co-Defensive Player of Year.  During his senior year, Cooper racked up Atlantic-10 Conference Defensive Player of Year in 2002, the George H. "Bulger" Lowe award from the Gridiron Club of Greater Boston as the top defensive football player in New England, and was named a 1st Team Defense 2002 Associated Press NCAA Division I-AA Football All-American.  He was also an American Football Coaches Association and Sports Network All-American as well.

In a game against Appalachian State, Cooper was named an I-AA All Star where he "turned the game around late in the third quarter, forcing ASU quarterback Joe Burchette into an interception with Maine trailing 10-0. The Black Bears scored two plays later and pulled out a 14-13 win. Cooper had 13 tackles, three solo and 10 assisted, three tackles for 15 yards of losses and two quarterback sacks for 14 yards of losses."  Throughout his college career spanning four years from 1999–2002, Cooper finished with 374 tackles, 57 tackles for loss, seven interceptions and 25 sacks.

2002 steroid possession 
A week after being named the top defensive player in New England, Cooper was caught with possession of about 1,000 steroid pills on November 1, 2002.  He was riding in a car that was speeding on I-95 in Hampden, Maine.  The driver, Patrick Kenney, allowed Trooper Michael Johnson to search the car in which he found the pills in a duffel bag sitting on the rear seat.  Cooper was not penalized for participation of any games during his senior year as possession of steroids did not violate NCAA rules.  A New York Times report stated "NCAA spokeswoman, Laronica L. Conway, said the illegal possession of steroids was an issue for the institution to resolve. There is no violation of NCAA bylaws unless a player is accused of actually ingesting the pills, not simply possessing them, she said from the association's headquarters in Indianapolis."

The University of Maine star pleaded guilty in federal court to possession of steroids. Cooper was released following his plea to the misdemeanor offense, and issued a statement saying he had planned not to use the drugs.

Professional career 
He was an undrafted agent in 2003.

References

External links
San Diego Chargers bio
Sports Illustrated - 2003 Draft Profile

1979 births
Living people
African-American players of American football
American football linebackers
American people of Cape Verdean descent
Maine Black Bears football players
San Diego Chargers players
People from Wareham, Massachusetts
Players of American football from Massachusetts
Sportspeople from Plymouth County, Massachusetts
21st-century African-American sportspeople
20th-century African-American sportspeople